Archery at the 2015 Southeast Asian Games was held at the Kallang Cricket Field, in Kallang, Singapore from 10 to 14 June 2015. Five competitions will be held in men, women and mixed's recurve and in men, women and mixed's compound.

Participating nations
A total of 117 athletes from eight nations will be competing in archery at the 2015 Southeast Asian Games:

Competition schedule
The following is the competition schedule for the archery competitions:

Medal table

Medalists

Recurve

Compound

Results

Recurve

Men's Ranking Round

Women's Ranking Round

Compound

Men's Ranking Round

Women's Ranking Round

References

External links
 

Archery at the Southeast Asian Games
Southeast Asian Games
2015 Southeast Asian Games events
International archery competitions hosted by Singapore
Kallang